The Rawlings Gold Glove Award, usually referred to as simply the Gold Glove, is the award given annually to the Major League Baseball (MLB) players judged to have exhibited superior individual fielding performances at each fielding position in both the National League (NL) and the American League (AL). Winners are determined from voting by the managers and coaches in each league, who are not permitted to vote for their own players. Additionally, a sabermetric component provided by the Society for American Baseball Research (SABR) accounts for about 25 percent of the vote.

In 1957, the baseball glove manufacturer Rawlings created the Gold Glove Award to commemorate the best fielding performance at each position. Winners receive a glove made from gold lamé-tanned leather and affixed to a walnut base. In the inaugural year, one Gold Glove was awarded to the top fielder at each position in MLB; since 1958, separate awards have been given to the top fielders in each league. In 2020, Rawlings began issuing a Gold Glove Award for team defense, with one recipient each in the American and National Leagues. Starting in 2022, a Gold Glove Award in each league has been awarded to a utility player.

Since 2016, a Gold Glove is also awarded each year to one fastpitch softball player in the National Pro Fastpitch league.

History

For the first four seasons of the award (1957 to 1960), individual awards were presented to left fielders, center fielders, and right fielders. From 1961 through 2010, the phrase "at each position" was no longer strictly accurate, since the prize was presented to three outfielders irrespective of their specific position. Any combination of outfielders, often three center fielders, could win the award in the same year. Critics called for awarding a single Gold Glove for each individual outfield position, arguing that the three outfield positions are not equivalent defensively. Starting in 2011, separate awards for each outfield position were once again presented. In the 1985 American League voting, a tie for third-place resulted in the presentation of Gold Glove Awards to four outfielders (Dwayne Murphy, Gary Pettis, Dwight Evans and Dave Winfield); this scenario was repeated in the National League in 2007 (Andruw Jones, Carlos Beltrán, Aaron Rowand, and Jeff Francoeur).

Before the involvement of the Society for American Baseball Research (SABR) in the voting process, The Boston Globe writer Peter Abraham said the Fielding Bible Awards "are far more accurate (and accountable)" than the Gold Glove awards since statistics are used along with the opinions of an expert panel. The Gold Gloves are selected by managers and coaches that may have seen a player as few as six times during the season. Bill Chuck of Comcast SportsNet New England wrote that Gold Glove voters frequently counted only errors to determine winners. Geoff Baker of The Seattle Times said the votes for the Gold Gloves rely largely on a player's past reputation. The Associated Press wrote that "some fans have viewed the Gold Gloves as mostly a popularity contest, even suggesting that a player's performance at the plate helped draw extra attention to his glove." After winning the AL Gold Glove at first base in both 1997 and 1998, Rafael Palmeiro won again in 1999 with the Texas Rangers while only appearing in 28 games as a first baseman; he played in 128 games as a designated hitter that season, resulting in a controversy. Derek Jeter, winner of five Gold Gloves, believes that many defensive factors cannot be quantified. In 2013, Rawlings collaborated on the Gold Glove Award with SABR, who provided the SABR Defensive Index (SDI) to add a sabermetric component to the selection process. The index accounted for 25 percent of the vote, while managers and coaches continued to provide the majority. Afterwards, Jay Jaffe of Sports Illustrated wrote that the Gold Gloves "appear to have significantly closed the gap on their more statistically-driven counterparts." SABR and FiveThirtyEight believed that the impact to the voting results by SDI, which is also included on the voters' ballots, went beyond its own 25% weight and also influenced the managers' and coaches' voting.

The most Gold Gloves ever won by one player is 18 by pitcher Greg Maddux. He won 13 consecutive awards from 1990 to 2002, all in the National League. Brooks Robinson has the most wins for a position player, with 16 Gold Gloves, all at third base, and is tied for the second-highest total overall with pitcher Jim Kaat; both players won their 16 awards consecutively. Iván Rodríguez has won the most Gold Gloves as a catcher, with 13 career awards in the American League. Ozzie Smith has 13 wins at shortstop; he and Rodríguez are tied for the fourth-highest total among all winners. Among outfielders, Roberto Clemente and Willie Mays, who played primarily right field and center field, respectively, are tied for the lead with 12 Gold Gloves. Keith Hernandez, the leader at first base, has won 11 times, and Roberto Alomar leads second basemen with 10 wins. Other players with 10 or more wins include shortstop Omar Vizquel (11), catcher Johnny Bench (10), third basemen Mike Schmidt (10), and Nolan Arenado (10) and outfielders Ken Griffey Jr., Ichiro Suzuki, Andruw Jones, and Al Kaline (10 each).

The only player to win Gold Gloves as an infielder and outfielder is Darin Erstad, who won Gold Gloves as an outfielder in 2000 and 2002 and as a first baseman in 2004, all with the Anaheim Angels. The only other player to win Gold Gloves at multiple positions is Plácido Polanco, who won at second base (2007, 2009 AL) and third base (2011 NL). Family pairs to win Gold Gloves include brothers Ken and Clete Boyer (third base), brothers Sandy Alomar Jr. (catcher) and Roberto Alomar (second base), Bengie and Yadier Molina (catcher), father and son Bobby and Barry Bonds (outfield), and father and son Bob (catcher) and Bret Boone (second base).

The 2021 St. Louis Cardinals hold the record for most Gold Gloves by a single team in a single season with five. They also won the team Gold Glove for the National League in the same year.

Winners

 won as a left fielder
 won as a center fielder
 won as a right fielder

All-time Gold Glove Team

On February 20, 2007, Major League Baseball and Rawlings announced that an all-time Gold Glove Team would be named during the 50th anniversary of the first Gold Glove Awards. Rawlings asked 70 baseball reporters, former players, and former managers to select 50 names for the ballot, from an initial selection of 250 names. The team was selected by fans, who voted at the Rawlings Gold Glove website, at United States Postal Service offices, and at sporting goods stores. The results were announced at the 2007 Major League Baseball All-Star Game.

Teammates

Middle infield duos

In the history of the Gold Glove Award, there have been twelve double-play combinations, or pairs of middle infielders, that have won awards in the same year. Shortstops and second basemen depend upon each other for the majority of double plays. The most common type of double play occurs with a runner on first base and a ground ball hit towards the middle of the infield. The player fielding the ball (generally the shortstop or second baseman) throws to the fielder covering second base, who steps on the base before the runner from first arrives to force that runner out, and then throws the ball to the first baseman to force out the batter for the second out. Mark Belanger won four Gold Gloves with the Baltimore Orioles alongside winning partner Bobby Grich, and Joe Morgan paired with Dave Concepción for four combination wins with the Cincinnati Reds. The most recent teammates to accomplish the feat are Andrelton Simmons and Ian Kinsler, who won with the Los Angeles Angels in 2018.

Batteries

Since 1957, there have been five Gold Glove batteries. The pitcher and catcher, collectively known as the battery, are the only two players on the field involved in every pitch. In particular, the pitcher and catcher control the running game with tools such as pickoffs or the strength of the catcher's throwing arm. The first pitcher and catcher on the same team to win Gold Gloves in the same year were Jim Kaat and Earl Battey, with the Minnesota Twins in 1962. Only two pairs of batterymates have won Gold Gloves together more than once: Iván Rodríguez and Kenny Rogers won with the Texas Rangers in 2000, and again with the Detroit Tigers in 2006. Yadier Molina and Adam Wainwright matched the feat, winning in both 2009 and 2013.

Platinum Glove Award

In 2011, Rawlings added an annual Platinum Glove Award awarded to the best defensive player in each league, as selected by fans from the year's Gold Glove winners. Numbers after a player's name indicate that he has won the award multiple times.

National Pro Fastpitch
In 2016, Rawlings announced it would begin awarding a gold glove annually to a female fastpitch softball player in the National Pro Fastpitch (NPF) league.
NPF coaches and managers vote for a winner (excluding those on their respective teams). This award is in addition to the collegiate and high school awards added in 2007, the 50th anniversary of the inaugural Gold Glove Awards.

See also

 Wilson Defensive Player of the Year Award
 Esurance MLB Awards – Best Defensive Player
 Rawlings Woman Executive of the Year Award – a minor league award also presented by Rawlings

Notes

References

External links

 MLB Awards (Gold Glove Winners)
 Rawlings Gold Glove Award website

 
Awards established in 1957